Gustavo Alexandre Cascão Capdeville (born 31 August 1997) is a Portuguese handball player for Benfica and the Portugal national team.

He represented Portugal at the 2020 European Men's Handball Championship.

Honours
Benfica
EHF European League: 2021–22

References

1997 births
Living people
Portuguese male handball players
Sportspeople from Lisbon
S.L. Benfica handball players
Handball players at the 2020 Summer Olympics